WGOC is an AM radio station broadcasting in Kingsport, Tennessee, under a Business Radio format. It broadcasts on AM frequency 1320 kHz and is under ownership of Cumulus Media.

History
The station signed on the air in 1951 under the call letters WKIN and was soon owned by Cy Bahakel. The station was originally daytime-only and, over the years, increased its power to 5,000 watts.

In the 1960s and 1970s the station was a popular Top 40 outlet with a personality-DJ format. Some key names over the years included:

 Bill Austin 
 Eddie Skelton 
 Joe Mills 
 Phil Roberts 
 John Selby Engineer 
 Gary Morse 
 Dick Winstead ("Richard Bailey Winstead," "Dickie-Doo") 
 Wayne Bernard ("Nard") (now known as Charlie Chase) 
 Mike Casey ("The Mighty Casey") 
 Charlie O'Day ("Good-Time Charlie") 
 Oscar Harris ("The Big O") 
 Ron Mack 
 Jonathan Lee Forrester 
 Terry Thomas 
 Ken Maness 
 Roger Lynn 
 Ric Darby 
 Reggie Jordan ("The Hit Man") 
 Jeff Taylor ("The Rocket Man," "J. Rocket") 
 Chuck Carroll ("The Funky Ol' Chuck-A-Luck") 
 Bill Meade 
 Bob Gordon ("Robert W. Gordon") 
 Mike Lee 
 TB Scott 
 Dave Miller 
 Steve Howard 
 John R. Kelly 
 Robin Hyatt 
 Gary Trudeau 
 Mark Evan McKinney 
 Tom Shannon ("Curly") 
 Steve Gilly 
 Don Dale 
 Dave Jeffries 
 Darwin Paustian
 Dick McClellan
 "Lonesome" Jim Edwards
 Chuck Ness
 "Professor" Matt Stevens
 Fred Williams
 Claude "Red" Kirk
 Dave Ray
 Joseph Reed (Jay Lee)

Nighttime service was added in 1981 with a new 4-tower directional array at the intersection of East Stone Drive and New Beason Well Road in Kingsport, and a nighttime power of 500 watts. The 5-kW daytime operation was consolidated to this site as well in about 1990.

In 1982 WKIN changed to a country format under the branding "A Great Brand Of Country." Variations of country and classic country would continue over the next couple of decades.

The WGOC call letters were on 640 AM from April 9, 1993 until Feb. 26, 2007, when the call letters were moved to what had been WKIN, a news/talk and sports station.

 Citadel Broadcasting, which had owned WJCW and WQUT since 1977, bought WGOC and WKIN in 2000. Prior to its current programming, WGOC was broadcasting a Classic Country/Bluegrass/Gospel format. Citadel merged with Cumulus Media on September 16, 2011.

References

External links
WKIN studio, exterior, 1953
WKIN studio, interior, 1953

GOC
Cumulus Media radio stations